Mahākāvya (lit. great kāvya, court epic), also known as sargabandha, is a genre of Indian epic poetry in Classical Sanskrit. The genre is characterised by ornate and elaborate descriptions of scenery, love, battles and so on — in short, everything that tests a poet's skill at description. Typical examples of mahākāvya are the Kumarasambhava and the Kiratarjuniya.

It is considered the most prestigious form in the Sanskrit literature. The genre evolved from the earlier epics, the Mahabharata and the Ramayana. Despite the length of mahākāvyas (15-30 cantos, a total of about 1500-3000 verses), they are still much shorter than the Ramayana (500 cantos, 24000 verses) and the Mahabharata (about 100000 verses).

Classical examples 

The Buddhist poet and philosopher Aśvaghoṣa (c. 80 – c. 150 CE) is one of the earliest Sanskrit poets with surviving Kāvya literature. His Buddhacarita (Acts of the Buddha) calls itself a mahākāvya and was influential enough to be translated into both Tibetan and Chinese. Another kāvya by Aśvaghoṣa is the Saundarananda, which focuses on the conversion of Nanda, Buddha's half-brother.

Tradition identifies five works as model mahākāvya:
Kumārasambhava by Kālidāsa in 5th century CE: the wedding of Shiva and Parvati, and the birth of Kumara, in 17 cantos
Raghuvaṃśa by Kālidāsa: the Raghu dynasty, in 19 cantos (about 1564 verses)
 Kiratarjuniya by Bharavi in 6th century CE: Arjuna's encounter with a Kirata (Shiva) 18 cantos(about 2500 years ago)
 Naiśadha-carita by Shriharsha in 1174 AD: on the life of King Nala and Queen Damayanti, 22 cantos
Śiśupāla-vadha by Māgha in 7th century CE: the slaying of Shishupala by Krishna,  22 cantos (about 1800 verses)

To this list, sometimes a sixth one is also added.

 Bhaṭṭikāvya, by Bhaṭṭi in 7th century CE: describes the events of the Ramayana and simultaneously illustrates the principles of Sanskrit grammar, 22 cantos

Characteristics
In the mahākāvya genre, more emphasis was laid on description than on narration. Indeed, the traditional characteristics of a mahākāvya are listed as:
 It must take its subject matter from the epics (Ramayana or Mahabharata), or from history,
 It must help further the four goals of man (Purusharthas), Rama and Karna were said to be the greatest men in Purushartha by sevaral writers such as Valmiki and Vyasa. Chanakya claimed the two men to be the greatest of all human beings who are selfless and keep their vows. For example- Rama despite being a step-son of Kaikeyi obeyed her and kept his promise, went to the forests for 14 years and had to suffer throughout his life in the forest. Similarly, Karna who was abandoned by Kunti but still when Kunti came to ask for something, Karna kept his promise and sacrificed his own life but did not let his brothers- Pandavas die.
 It must contain descriptions of cities, seas, mountains, moonrise and sunrise, and "accounts of merrymaking in gardens, of bathing parties, drinking bouts, and love-making. It should tell the sorrow of separated lovers and should describe a wedding and the birth of a son. It should describe a king's council, an embassy, the marching forth of an army, a battle, and the victory of a hero".

About this list, Ingalls observes:

It is composed of a varying number of  short poems or cantos, that tells  the story of a classical epic. Each poem is composed in a metre that is fitting to the subject matter, such as a description of the seasons, a geographical form of nature such as a mountain, and cities.

Modern mahakavya

In the relatively secluded world of modern Sanskrit literature, mahakavyas continue to be produced. Some of these have been awarded the Sahitya Akademi Award for Sanskrit. In the introduction to Ṣoḍaśī: An Anthology of Contemporary Sanskrit Poets (1992), Radhavallabh Tripathi writes:
On the other hand, the number of authors who appear to be very enthusiastic about writing in Sanskrit during these days is not negligible. […] In a thesis dealing with Sanskrit mahākāvyas written in a single decade, 1961–1970, the researcher [Dr. Ramji Upadhyaya] has noted 52 Sanskrit mahākāvyas (epic poems) produced in that very decade.

Some modern mahākāvyas do not aim to satisfy all the traditional criteria, and take as their subject historical matter (such as Rewa Prasad Dwivedi's Svatantrya Sambhavam on the Indian independence movement, or K.N. Ezhuthachan's Keralodayah on the history of Kerala), or biographies of historical characters (such as S.B. Varnekar's Shrishivarajyodayam on Shivaji, M. S. Aney's Sritilakayasornavah on Bal Gangadhar Tilak, or P. C. Devassia's Kristubhagavatam on Jesus Christ). Some others like the Śrībhārgavarāghaviyam (2002) composed by Jagadguru Rāmabhadrācārya continue to have the subject of the traditional epics.

References

External links
 The Naishadha-charita English translation by K. K. Handiqui  [proofread] (includes glossary)
The Ramayana : In Classical Sanskrit and Prakrt Mahakavya Literature/V. Raghavan

Indian literature